The 2010 Season was the 98th season of competitive soccer in the United States.

National teams 

The home team or the team that is designated as the home team is listed in the left column; the away team is in the right column.

Men

Senior

Friendly matches

2010 FIFA World Cup

For the 2010 FIFA World Cup, the United States men's national team was drawn into, and emerged victorious from, Group C.

Under-20 

Copa Chivas

Dallas Cup

The United States U-20 team participated in the "Super Group" at the 2010 Dallas Cup.

Milk Cup

Torneo de las Américas

Under-17 

Nike International Friendlies

Women

Senior 

Algarve Cup

The United States women won the 2010 Algarve Cup, their seventh title at the annual tournament.

Friendly matches

2010 CONCACAF Women's Gold Cup

2011 FIFA World Cup qualification (UEFA-CONCACAF play-off)

Under-20 

2010 CONCACAF Under-20 Women's Championship

The United States women's national under-20 soccer team won the 2010 CONCACAF Under-20 Women's Championship, ...

La Manga Cup

The women's U-20 team also participated in and won the women's portion of the 2010 La Manga Cup. The women's portion of the tournament was conducted as a four-team group stage.

Friendly matches

2010 FIFA Under-20 Women's World Cup

Under-17 

2010 CONCACAF Under-17 Women's Championship

Dallas Cup

Nordic Cup

Managerial changes

League tables

Major League Soccer

Playoffs

MLS Cup

USSF Division 2 Professional League

Playoffs 
Each round is a two-game aggregate goal series. Home teams for the first game of each series listed at the bottom of the bracket.

Finals

USL Second Division

Playoffs

Final

U.S. Open Cup

Final

Honors

Professional

Amateur

American clubs in international competitions

CONCACAF Champions League

2009–10 Champions League

The Columbus Crew were the only American team to qualify for the Championship Round of the 2009–10 CONCACAF Champions League, the only portion of the competition to occur in the 2010 calendar year. Columbus was drawn against Mexican club Toluca in the quarterfinals. After falling behind at home by two goals in the first half of the first leg, Steven Lenhart notched two second half goals for the Crew to draw even at 2–2. In the return leg in Toluca, the clubs traded goals, with Toluca scoring first and last for the 3–2 victory and 5–4 aggregate victory.

Columbus Crew

2010–11 Champions League

The Columbus Crew, Real Salt Lake, Los Angeles Galaxy, and Seattle Sounders FC qualified for the 2010–11 CONCACAF Champions League. Los Angeles, MLS Supporters' Shield runners-up, and Seattle, 2009 U.S. Open Cup champions, entered in the Preliminary Round, the opening round of the tournament; Columbus, winners of the 2009 MLS Supporters' Shield, and Salt Lake, winners of the 2009 MLS Cup, entered in the Group Stage.

Preliminary round

In the preliminary round, Los Angeles was drawn against the Puerto Rico Islanders, the 2010 Caribbean champions, and Seattle was drawn against Salvadoran club Isidro Metapán. Both American clubs played as hosts during the first leg of their respective two-legged affairs. The Sounders, on the strength of a Fredy Montero goal in the 60th minute, won their home leg 1–0. Los Angeles, however, holders of the best record in Major League Soccer at the time of their matchup, were defeated 4–1 at the Home Depot Center. The Islanders scored two goals in each half before the Galaxy got a consolation own goal by Richard Martinez in the 83rd minute. In the return leg in Bayamón, Los Angeles, needing to win by at least three goals to force penalties, gave up the first goal of the match. The Galaxy eventually scored two goals for the 2–1 victory but still lost 5–3 on aggregate. Seattle, however was able to secure a 1–1 draw in San Salvador for the 2–1 aggregate victory to move into the group stage.

Los Angeles Galaxy

Seattle Sounders

Group stage

The group stage draw was conducted prior to the preliminary round, so each team knew all of their opponents as soon as the preliminary round ended. The Columbus Crew, Real Salt Lake, and Seattle Sounders FC each qualified for the group stage.

Real Salt Lake was drawn into Group A against Mexican club Cruz Azul, winners of the 2009–10 Apertura; Panamanian club Árabe Unido, 2009 Apertura II and 2010 Clausura champions; and fellow MLS club Toronto FC, winners of the 2010 Canadian Championship. Salt Lake hosted Árabe Unido in their first group stage match and defeated los Árabes 2–1 on the strength of two Álvaro Saborío goals, his second coming in the fourth minute of second-half added time. Salt Lake's second match was a dramatic affair in a torrential downpour at Estadio Azul in Mexico City, with hosts Cruz Azul emerging as 5–4 victors.

Columbus was drawn into Group B with Mexican club Santos Laguna, 2009–10 Bicentenario winner; Guatemalan club Municipal, champions of the 2009–10 Liga Nacional Apertura and Clausura tournaments; and Trinidad and Tobago club Joe Public, 2010 Caribbean runners-up and 2009 TT Pro League champions. The Crew hosted Municipal in their first match and won 1–0, the goal scored on a strong individual effort by Emmanuel Ekpo. In their second match, Columbus nearly held on for a scoreless draw but were defeated 1–0 at Santos Laguna when Jorge Iván Estrada scored in the third minute of second half added time.

Seattle was drawn into Group C with Mexican club Monterrey, 2009–10 Apertura champions; Costa Rican club Saprissa, 2009–10 Primera División Campeonato de Verano champions; and Honduran club Marathón, 2009–10 Liga Nacional Torneo Apertura champions. In their first group stage match, Seattle visited Marathón at Estadio Olímpico Metropolitano, and after scoring the opening goal, conceded two – all scored in the first half – for a 2–1 loss. Seattle's second match saw another loss as visiting Monterrey came away from Qwest Field with a 2–0 victory.

Real Salt Lake

Columbus Crew

Seattle Sounders

2010 SuperLiga 

The Houston Dynamo, Chicago Fire, Chivas USA, and New England Revolution qualified for the 2010 SuperLiga based upon their finish in the 2009 Major League Soccer season as the four highest-finishing teams not to qualify for the 2010–11 Champions League.

New England Revolution

Houston Dynamo

Chicago Fire

Chivas USA

References